Women's Museum may refer to:

Bonn Women's Museum, Bonn, Germany
Hittisau Women's Museum, Hittisau, Austria
International Museum of Women, San Francisco, California, United States
Museum van de Vrouw (Women's Museum), Echt, Netherlands
Women's Museum, Aarhus, Denmark
National Museum of Women in the Arts, Washington, D.C., United States
National Women's History Museum, Alexandria, Virginia, United States
Smithsonian American Women's History Museum, Washington, D.C., United States
United States Army Women's Museum, Fort Lee, Virginia, United States
The Women's Museum, Dallas, Texas, United States
Women's Museum İstanbul, Istanbul, Turkey
İzmir Women Museum, İzmir, Turkey
Museum of Women, museum scheduled to open in 2022 in Manhattan

See also 
Women's Hall of Fame (disambiguation)
East End Women's Museum, London, United Kingdom